Career Soldiers may refer to:
 Career Soldiers (band), a Street punk / Hardcore punk band from Southern California.
 Standing army, an army composed of full-time professional soldiers who do not disband during times of peace.